Francis Meechan (27 October 1929 – 20 August 1976) was a Scottish footballer who played as a defender for Petershill, Celtic and Stirling Albion. He played for Celtic in three Scottish Cup Finals in the mid-1950s, beating Aberdeen in 1954 (as part of a double with the Scottish Football League, the club's first championship since the 1930s) followed by defeats at the hands of Clyde in 1955 and Hearts in 1956.

After retiring as a player Meechan became a scout for Celtic in a link with his local club Cumbernauld United (where a teenage Kenny Dalglish was farmed out for experience during the period), but died aged 46 – the Frank Meechan Memorial Charity Match in Cumbernauld was played in his memory.

References

External links

Francis Meechan, The Celtic Wiki

1929 births
1976 deaths
Footballers from North Lanarkshire
Association football fullbacks
Scottish footballers
Petershill F.C. players
Celtic F.C. non-playing staff
Celtic F.C. players
Stirling Albion F.C. players
Scottish Football League players
Place of birth missing
Scottish Junior Football Association players
People from Cumbernauld
People from Croy